The Givetian is one of two faunal stages in the Middle Devonian Period. It lasted from  million years ago to   million years ago. It was preceded by the Eifelian Stage and followed by the Frasnian Stage. It is named after the town of Givet in France. The oldest forests occurred during the late Givetian. The lower GSSP is located at Jebel Mech Irdane, Tafilalt, Morocco.

Name and definition 
The Givetian Stage was proposed in 1879 by French geologist Jules Gosselet and was accepted for the higher stage of the Middle Devonian by the Subcommission on Devonian Stratigraphy in 1981.

References

Further reading 
 

 
Middle Devonian
Devonian geochronology
.
Devonian North America